Ann Bradshaw (born 25 March 1957) is a British former swimmer. She competed in three events at the 1976 Summer Olympics. The 1976 British Olympic team for the Women's 200 m freestyle - Swimming event included Susan Edmondson, Susan Barnard and Bradshaw.

References

External links
 

1957 births
Living people
British female swimmers
Olympic swimmers of Great Britain
Swimmers at the 1976 Summer Olympics
Place of birth missing (living people)
British female freestyle swimmers
20th-century British women